Articulo – Journal of Urban Research is a peer-reviewed academic journal covering urban issues and publishes both theoretical and empirical articles. It is abstracted and indexed in several online directories, including Scopus, the French Evaluation Agency for Research and Higher Education (AERES), and Intute.
Articulo is hosted by Revues.org, a platform for journals in the humanities and social sciences run by the Centre for Open Electronic Publishing and several academic institutions in France. Articulo publishes thematic issues, book reviews and conference proceedings. Papers are published in English or French.

References

External links 
 

Publications established in 2005
Sociology journals
Multilingual journals
Biannual journals
Urban studies and planning journals
Mass media companies of Luxembourg